Square Angel (foaled April 4, 1970 in Ontario) was a Canadian Champion Thoroughbred racehorse.

Background
Bred by E. P. Taylor, Square Angel was sired by 1964 Belmont Stakes winner Quadrangle. Her dam was Nangela, a daughter of Nearctic, the sire  of one of the most influential sires in Thoroughbred history, Northern Dancer.

Racing career
Square Angel was purchased and raced by General W. Preston Gilbride CBE, DSO, CO-N, who entrusted her race conditioning to future Canadian Horse Racing Hall of Fame trainer Frank Merrill, Jr. A stakes winner at two, as a three-year-old in 1973, Square Angel won Canada's most important race for fillies of her age group: the Canadian Oaks. In addition to a win in the Fury Stakes and Nettie Handicap she  finished first in the Wonder Where Stakes but was disqualified and set back to second. Square Angel's performances earned her Canadian Champion Three-Year-Old Filly honours.

Broodmare
Retired to broodmare duty, Square Angel was the dam of four stakes winners and one additional stakes-placed winner from six foals to race. Among her best offspring were Kamar (b. 1976), a Canadian Champion Three-Year-Old Filly and the 1990 Kentucky Broodmare of the Year, and Love Smitten (b. 1981), whose wins included the Grade 1 Apple Blossom Handicap and the Grade 2 Santa Maria Handicap and who was the dam of Swain. Kamar's daughter, Jood produced Fantastic Light.

References

1970 racehorse births
Racehorses bred in Ontario
Racehorses trained in Canada
Canadian Champion racehorses
Thoroughbred family 14-c
Blue Hen Broodmare